Morrell is a surname.

Morrell may also refer to:

 Thule Island, south Atlantic Ocean, sometimes called Morrell Island
 Morrell Point
 Morrell Reef, Antarctica
 Morrell (DART station), Dallas, Texas
 Morrell Avenue, Oxford, England
 Morrell's Island, an erroneously reported island supposed to be in the Northwestern Hawaiian Island
 Eucalyptus trees:
 Red morrel (Eucalyptus longicornis)
 Black morrel (Eucalyptus melanoxylon)

See also
 Morrells Brewing Company
 Morrill (disambiguation)
 Morell (disambiguation)
 Morel (disambiguation)